Jason Surrell is a former show writer and producer for Walt Disney Imagineering, the division of The Walt Disney Company that designs and builds for Disney's theme parks and resort hotels. Surrell also is a show director for Walt Disney Entertainment.  In June 2014, Surrell left Walt Disney Imagineering and is now with Universal Creative.

Career
His work has included the creation of an animated Haunted Mansion tombstone at the Magic Kingdom attraction, which pays homage to Imagineer Leota Toombs, who supplied the face of Madame Leota. He also has created show concepts for The Great Movie Ride, Who Wants to Be a Millionaire - Play It! and Walt Disney: One Man's Dream at Disney's Hollywood Studios.

Writing
He contributed essays to The Imagineering Way and The Imagineering Workout. Surrell also regularly appears on panels, gives presentations, and interviews other Imagineers at various Disney events.

Surrell wrote a screenwriting manual, Screenplay by Disney: Tips and Techniques to Add Magic to Your Moviemaking, and has also contributed to the Kingdom Keepers series of children's novels by Ridley Pearson.

Bibliography
 The Haunted Mansion: From the Magic Kingdom to the Movies (Known in its 3rd Edition as The Haunted Mansion: Imagineering a Classic)
 The Art of the Haunted Mansion
 Screenplay by Disney: Tips and Techniques to Add Magic to Your Moviemaking
 Pirates of the Caribbean: From the Magic Kingdom to the Movies
 The Disney Mountains: Imagineering at its Peak

External links

Year of birth missing (living people)
Living people
Amusement ride manufacturers
Disney imagineers
Walt Disney Parks and Resorts people
American children's writers
21st-century American non-fiction writers
Screenwriting instructors